Jaronimas Kastytis Juodikaitis  (February 1, 1932 – April 1, 2000) was a Lithuanian painter.

See also
List of Lithuanian painters
Universal Lithuanian Encyclopedia

1932 births
2000 deaths
20th-century Lithuanian painters